Joanna Carolyn Penn, Baroness Penn (born 1985), known as JoJo Penn, is a British political advisor. She was a baroness-in-waiting (a government whip) from March 2020 to September 2022. Since October 2022, she has been a parliamentary secretary (a junior minister) in HM Treasury.

Biography
She served as Deputy Chief of Staff to Prime Minister Theresa May from 2016 to 2019. In September 2019, it was announced that she would be made a Conservative Party life peer in the 2019 Prime Minister's Resignation Honours. She was created Baroness Penn, of Teddington in the London Borough of Richmond, on 10 October 2019. 

Penn became the youngest member of the House of Lords when she joined the House on 21 October 2019: she was succeeded as baby of the house by Lord Harlech following the election on 14 July 2021. She made her maiden speech on 30 January 2020 during a debate on Defence, Diplomacy and Development Policy. From 29 October 2019 to 21 April 2020, she was a member of the Lord's Science and Technology Committee. She served as a baroness-in-waiting, a junior government whip, from 19 March 2020 to 20 September 2022. Since 30 October 2022, she has been a parliamentary secretary, the most junior level of minister, in HM Treasury.

References

1985 births
Living people
British political consultants
Conservative Party (UK) life peers
Conservative Party (UK) people
Life peeresses created by Elizabeth II